The following is the qualification system and qualified athletes, countries and teams for the Archery at the 2019 Pan American Games competitions.

Qualification system
A total of 84 archers will qualify to compete at the games (42 per gender). A country may enter a maximum of eight archers (four per gender). As host nation, Peru qualifies four athletes automatically (one per individual event). Two qualification tournaments were used to determine the 62 qualifiers in recurve and 18 in compound.

Recurve
A country may enter a maximum of three recurve athletes per gender (for a maximum of six total). As host, Peru automatically receives one quota per gender. At the first qualification tournament, the top six teams in the team event qualify along with four individuals per gender. At the second qualification tournament, the top two team along with three individuals will qualify per gender. If a country that won an individual quota(s) at the first tournament, wins a team quota at the second tournament, those individual spots will be reallocated to the second qualification individual event.

Compound
A total of ten archers per gender will qualify. As host, Peru automatically receives one quota per gender. The top four mixed teams in the first qualification tournament will qualify along with three individuals per gender. The remaining two spots per gender will be decided at the second qualification tournament.

Qualification timeline

Qualification summary

Recurve men

Recurve women

Compound men

Compound women

References

P
P
Qualification for the 2019 Pan American Games
Archery at the 2019 Pan American Games